Eden Hills may refer to:

 Eden Hills, South Australia, a suburb in Adelaide, Australia
 Eden Hills, a fictitious suburb in the Australian TV soap opera Neighbours